The following is a list of the 74 municipalities (comuni) of the Province of Verbano-Cusio-Ossola, Piedmont, Italy.

List

See also 
List of municipalities of Italy

References 

Verbano-Cusio-Ossola